No. 31 Squadron is a squadron of the Royal New Zealand Air Force. Formed in December 1943, it was equipped with Grumman TBF Avenger Torpedo bombers.

History
31 Squadron was stationed in New Zealand from December 1943 to May 1944. The squadron deployed to Piva Airfield on Bougainville from May to July 1944. The squadron was disbanded in August 1944.

Insignia and motto
The badge of 31 Squadron included a carved Greenstone Taniwha above two crossed Mere. The squadron's motto (also included on the badge) was Kia Mataara, Te reo Maori for "Watch".

Commanding officers
Squadron Leader M. Wilkes.

References

31
Squadrons of the RNZAF in World War II
Military units and formations established in 1943
Military units and formations disestablished in 1944